Alumni of Mayo College and now Mayo College Girls School are often referred to as Mayoites, they include Statesmen, Writers, Athletes, Businesspersons, Diplomats, etc.

Art

Civil Servants

Conservationists

Diplomats

Media and journalism

Royalty

Politicians

Writers

Armed forces

Commerce and Industry

Manufacturing

Hospitality and drinks

Information Technology

Finance & Banking

Media and Entertainment

Law

Sportspersons and Athletes

Science, Innovation and Academia

References

External links
Official website of: "Mayo College", Ajmer, Rajasthan, India
Official website of "Mayo College Girs' School", Ajmer, Rajasthan, India
IPSC school profile

Mayoites